Blackgrass is a 1995 LP released by Earl Lee Grace.

Production notes

Earl Lee Grace is a pseudonym of Dwarves front-man Paul Cafaro, most well known as Blag Dahlia. A review by Allmusic claims that Grace is a 15-year-old guitarist, which is false.

Track listing
 "Saturday Night" (Dahlia)
 "Every Girl In The World" (Dahlia)
 "Viodinah" (Dahlia)
 "Together" (Dahlia)
 "Riding on the Road" (Dahlia)
 "Coyote Bridge" (Schiele)
 "Sharon Needles" (Dahlia)
 "Long, Long Time" (Dahlia)
 "7-11" (Dahlia)
 "Kitchen Girl" (Schiele)
 "Big Vics" (Dahlia)
 "So Good" (Dahlia)
 "Sunday Morn" (Dahlia)

Personnel

Earl Lee Grace - vocals
Dee Lamnon - vocals
Karen Raymond - vocals
Peter Straus - vocals
Brian Godehaux - fiddle, vocals
P. Alan Wooton - guitar, vocals
Jonathan Schiele - banjo
Paul Knight - bass
Jim Mintun - dobro
Alan Bond - mandolin
2-Pc. Jason - jaw harp
Josh Freese - phantom percussion
Wilson Gil - everything else

References

1995 albums
Bluegrass albums
Sympathy for the Record Industry albums
Country albums by American artists